Petar Popović (born 13 July 1959) is a Croatian professional basketball coach and former player.

Playing career 
Popović played for Zadar in the Yugoslav First League (later Croatian League) for 18 seasons. In 1993 he moved to Zagreb where he signed with Benston of the Croatian League.

National team  career
Popović was a member of the Yugoslavia national team, alongside Krešimir Ćosić, Dragan Kićanović, Dražen Dalipagić and Mirza Delibašić, that won the silver medal at the EuroBasket 1981 held in Czechoslovakia. Over six tournament games, he averaged 2.3 points per game. Also, he won the bronze medal at the 1978 European Championship for Juniors in Italy where he averaged 10 points per game.

Coaching career 
Popović was selected as the head coach for Zadar twice; the first time briefly in 2001, and later from the end of the 2005–06 season till March 2007.

Personal life 
His son, Marko, was also a professional basketball player. His nephews are both former professional basketballers, Alan Gregov, who won the silver medal with the Croatia national team at the 1992 Summer Olympics in Barcelona, a bronze medal at the 1994 FIBA World Championship and a bronze medal at EuroBasket 1993, and Arijan Komazec.

References

1959 births
Living people
Croatian men's basketball players
Croatian basketball coaches
Croatian people of Serbian descent
KK Dubrava players
KK Zadar coaches
KK Zadar players
Sportspeople from Kraljevo
Serbian men's basketball players
Serbian expatriate basketball people in Croatia
Serbian emigrants to Croatia
Shooting guards
Yugoslav men's basketball players